Bergen 1996 is a live EP by Norwegian black metal band Gorgoroth. It was released in November 2007 on vinyl by Forces of Satan Records and on CD by Regain Records. The tracks were recorded live at Maxime in Bergen, Norway, on 23 May 1996. It was previously released in 1996 as The Last Tormentor on limited pressing of 666 copies.

Track listing

Personnel
Ares – bass guitar
Grim – drums
Infernus – guitars
Pest – vocals

References

Gorgoroth albums
2007 EPs
Live EPs
2007 live albums
Forces of Satan Records live albums
Forces of Satan Records EPs